The I Constitutional Government was the first Constitutional Government (administration or cabinet) under the Constitution of East Timor.  Formed on 20 May 2002, it was led by the country's second Prime Minister, Mari Alkatiri, and was replaced by the II Constitutional Government on 10 July 2006.

Initial composition
From 20 May 2002 until it was restructured on 26 July 2005, the government was made up of Ministers, Vice Ministers and Secretaries of State, as follows:

Ministers

Vice Ministers

Secretaries of State

Restructured composition
Following the restructuring on 26 July 2005, the government was made up of Ministers, Vice Ministers and Secretaries of State, as follows:

Ministers

Vice Ministers

Secretaries of State

References

Notes

Further reading

 
 

East Timor
East Timor
Constitutional Governments of East Timor
2002 establishments in East Timor
2006 disestablishments in East Timor